Westpoint Exeter (formerly Westpoint Arena) is a multi-purpose indoor arena and showground, at Clyst St Mary, near Exeter, England. The capacity of the venue is 7,500 people. It hosts local concerts, fairs and exhibitions. Westpoint is the largest exhibition and entertainment venue in the South West and is located near to Exeter Airport.

Construction

Westpoint's arena and showground was built on the former Ivington Farm to host the annual Devon County Show each May. The farm was purchased by the Devon County Agricultural Association, with work on the site estimated to have cost a further sum in excess of £3 million. 50,000 square feet of unobstructed floor space, and a building capable of seating 6,000 people opened in 1990. The 4,590 sq metre column-free main arena doubles as an exhibition area and, for the County Show, a cattle shed. Large car parks can accommodate well over 12,000 cars at any one time.

The Association and its subsidiary company Westpoint Centre (Devon) Ltd rent the facilities out to event organisers during the remainder of the year.

History
It has been the venue for the Devon County Show since 1990. Since 2009, it has played host to a week of the Premier League Darts.

The arena has hosted performances by acclaimed British artists including Manic Street Preachers, and car shows such as the BHP Fuel Fest.

The creation of a Nightingale Hospital at Westpoint Exeter during the UK COVID-19 Coronavirus crisis was announced in April 2020, but the location was changed later the same month to a former Homebase store in Sowton on the outskirts of Exeter.

See also
 Devon County Show

References

External links

Indoor arenas in England
Exhibition and conference centres in England
Darts venues
Buildings and structures in Devon
Buildings and structures completed in 1990